The Scottish Wheelchair Curling Championship is the national championship for wheelchair curling in Scotland. The event has been held since 2003.

Winners

References

External links

See also
Scottish Men's Curling Championship
Scottish Women's Curling Championship
Scottish Mixed Curling Championship
Scottish Mixed Doubles Curling Championship
Scottish Junior Curling Championships
Scottish Senior Curling Championships
Scottish Schools Curling Championship

Curling competitions in Scotland
Recurring sporting events established in 2003
Annual sporting events in the United Kingdom
Annual events in Scotland
National curling championships
Wheelchair curling